Albert Woolley (1871–1896) was an English footballer who played in the Football League for Aston Villa and Derby County.

References

1871 births
1896 deaths
English footballers
Association football forwards
English Football League players
Aston Villa F.C. players
Derby County F.C. players